Fahrenheit Fair Enough is the first studio album by Telefon Tel Aviv, an American electronic music duo consisting of Joshua Eustis and Charles Cooper. It was released on Hefty Records in 2001. The reissue edition of the album, with additional bonus tracks, was released on Ghostly International in 2016.

Critical reception

Kenyon Hopkin of AllMusic called the album "a soothing listen and one that'll bring you down gently." Peter Marsh of BBC commented that "Apparently the pair came together through a shared love of 'innovative classical music' and while that's not maybe immediately apparent, there is a linear progression to the pieces here that transcend the usual piling up and subtraction that passes for structure in much electronica." Paul Cooper of Pitchfork said, "Though Fahrenheit Fair Enough includes nothing incisive or insightful, it's nonetheless an intriguing release." He added, "it's somewhat frustrating because, while the duo occasionally displays the beauty they're truly capable of, they generally settle for a disappointing simulacrum."

Track listing

Personnel
Credits adapted from liner notes.

Telefon Tel Aviv
 Joshua Eustis – music
 Charles Cooper – music

Additional personnel
 Alfredo Nogueira – additional drums (4), acoustic guitar (4)
 Roger Seibel – mastering
 Graphic Havoc – design
 Francesco Clemente – artwork
 Dorothy Zeidman – photography

References

External links
 

2001 debut albums
Telefon Tel Aviv albums
Ghostly International albums
Hefty Records albums